The Eastern Punjab Railway was the successor of the North Western State Railway in East Punjab after the partition of India. In 1952, Northern Railway was formed with a portion of East Indian Railway Company, north-west of Mughalsarai, Jodhpur Railway, Bikaner Railway and Eastern Punjab Railway.

References 

Defunct railway companies of India